Titilagarh (Sl. No.: 69) is a Vidhan Sabha constituency of Balangir district, Odisha.

This constituency includes Titlagarh, Titilagarh block, Saintala block and Tentulikhunti (Gudvella) block.

In 2009 election, Indian National Congress candidate Surendra Singh Bhoi defeated Biju Janata Dal candidate Jogendra Behera by a margin of 4,838 votes.

Elected Members

Fifteen elections were held between 1951 and 2014.
Elected members from the Titlagarh constituency are:
2019: (69): Tukuni Sahu, Biju Janata Dal
2014: (69): Tukuni Sahu, Biju Janata Dal
2009: (69): Surendra Singh Bhoi, Indian National Congress
2004: (106): Jogendra Behera, Biju Janata Dal
2000: (106): Jogendra Behera, Biju Janata Dal
1995: (106): Jogendra Behera, Janata Dal
1990: (106): Jogendra Behera, Janata Dal
1985: (106): Purna Chandra Mahananda, Indian National Congress
1980: (106): Lalit Mohan Gandhi, Congress-I
1977: (106): Lalit Mohan Gandhi, Indian National Congress
1974: (106): Tapi Jal, Swatantra Party
1971: (107): Tapi Jal, Swatantra Party
1967: (107): Achyutananda Mahananda, Swatantra Party
1961: (42): Achyutananda Mahananda, Ganatantra Parishad
1957: (30): Rajendra Narayan Singh Deo, Ganatantra Parishad and Achyutananda Mahananda, Ganatantra Parishad
1951: (22): Ramesh Chandra Bhoi, Ganatantra Parishad and Muralidhar Panda, Ganatantra Parishad

2019 Election Result

2014 Election Result
In 2014 election, Biju Janata Dal candidate Tukuni Sahu defeated Indian National Congress candidate Surendra Singh Bhoi by a margin of 14,022 votes.

Summary of results of the 2009 Election

Notes

References

Assembly constituencies of Odisha
Balangir district